Big Nellie Mountain is a volcanic plug in the Mid North Coast region of New South Wales, Australia.

See also 

 List of mountains in New South Wales

References

Big Nellie
Mid North Coast